The Nyon–St-Cergue–Morez Railway (NStCM), is a narrow gauge railway in western Switzerland which nowadays operates between Nyon, on the northern shore of Lake Geneva and the French border at La Cure, the La Cure–Morez section having closed in 1958.

History
The line, built to  gauge, was opened in three sections, the first from Nyon, a town on the shores of Lake Geneva, to the Jura mountain resort village of Saint-Cergue on 12 July 1916, then to the French border at La Cure, opened on 18 August 1917. In effect this small line linked the Swiss railways main line from Geneva to Lausanne to that of the Chemins de fer de Paris à Lyon et à la Méditerranée (PLM) (from 1938 this was the SNCF). With the exception of the period from 1940 to 1948 this enabled direct services to operate on a daily basis, although wintertime conditions often made this a difficult feat. Because of its steep gradients the line was electrified from the outset at the unusual, if not unique, 2,200 Volts DC. The  French section from La Cure to Morez closed on 28 September 1958.

The line
Originally the line commenced outside the main station in Nyon and after passing below the Swiss Federal Railways main line it climbed steadily, steeply in places taking large curves to ease the gradient, to the mountain resort of St. Cergue. It was here the line crossed the French border and again running alongside the road, passing the village of Les Rousses it duly arrived in the streets of Morez. The line then descended steeply to terminate in front of the PLM station.

Locomotives and Rolling Stock

all motor coaches are double cab
all driving trailers are single cab
B 341-342 are MU-wired for push-pull operation with Be4/4 201-205, BDe4/4 211 and Bt 301-305

Abbreviations
ACMV  :   Ateliers de constructions mécaniques de Vevey
BBC   :   Brown, Boveri & Cie
BD    :   Bremgarten-Dietikon Bahn
BTI   :   Biel-Taufelen-Ins Bahn
CJ    :   Chemins de fer du Jura
LEB   :   Chemin de fer Lausanne-Echallens-Bercher
RhB   :   Rhätische Bahn
SAAS  :   S.A. Ateliers Sécheron, Geneva
SWS   :   Schweizerische Wagons & Aufzügefabrik
YSteC :   Chemin de fer Yverdon – Ste. Croix

Modernisation
The earliest section to open, that in Switzerland, continued after the closure of the French section and in the 1980s was part of a modernisation programme.
The overline line voltage was changed from 2,200 Volts DC to the more common 1,500 Volts DC and automatic block signalling was installed.  Work to modernise the infrastructure and implement the voltage change took place throughout 1984 and 1985.  The St. Cergue–La Cure section was changed to the new, reduced voltage in mid-October 1985 and the Nyon–St. Cergue section followed on 5 December 1985.  As part of this modernisation, new rolling stock was purchased, and arrived starting in autumn 1985.  These were new automotrice (powered driving railcars) and matching voitures pilote (driving trailers). During the transitional phase in the line voltage, the old cars were able to continue in service after the reduction in voltage, but at reduced speed. The old stock ran for the last time on 20 December 1985, and from 21 December all service was operated by the new trains.

In 2004, the Nyon terminus was moved to a two platform underground station on the north side of the main line approached by escalators from the station underpass.

Preservation
The original “automotrice”, of which 7 were built, were heavy duty vehicles and could haul several trailer cars. Two of these have survived, restored to working order, at the Chemin de Fer de la Mure near Grenoble. Two other examples were sold to the same railway but have yet to be restored. Some trailer cars have also survived including No. B7 which has been restored at the Blonay–Chamby museum railway near Montreux and another example at the Chemin de Fer Voies Ferrees du Velay in Haute Loire. The vehicles carried a dark red livery.

Gallery

References

External links

 http://www.nstcm.ch/

NStCM
Railway lines in Switzerland
Metre gauge railways in Switzerland
1500 V DC railway electrification
Transport in the canton of Vaud
Swiss companies established in 1916
Railway companies established in 1916